Berthier was a federal electoral district in the Canadian province of Quebec that was represented in the House of Commons of Canada from 1867 to 1925.

It was created by the British North America Act, 1867, and was abolished in 1924 when it was merged into Berthier—Maskinongé riding.

A second "Berthier" riding was created in 1966. This riding was renamed Berthier—Maskinongé in 1975. Please see the article on that riding for the history of Berthier during this period.

Members of Parliament
This riding elected the following Members of Parliament:

Election results

By-election: On Mr. Paquet being called to the Senate

By-election: Mr. C. Beausoleil appointed Postmaster of Montreal 1 December 1899.

See also 
 List of Canadian federal electoral districts
 Past Canadian electoral districts

External links
Riding history from the Library of Parliament

Former federal electoral districts of Quebec